Horace Gray Lunt (September 12, 1918 – August 11, 2010) was a linguist in the field of Slavic Studies. He was Professor Emeritus at the Slavic Language and Literature Department and the Ukrainian Institute at Harvard University.

Born in Colorado Springs, Lunt attended Harvard College (BA 1941), the University of California (MA 1942), Charles University in Prague (1946–47), and Columbia University (PhD 1950). As a student of Roman Jakobson at Columbia, he joined the Harvard University faculty in 1949 together with his mentor. There he taught the course on Old Church Slavonic grammar for four decades, creating what has become the standard handbook on it, now in its seventh edition.

He published numerous monographs, articles, essays, and reviews on all aspects of Slavic comparative and historical linguistics and philology. 

Lunt also wrote the first English grammar of Macedonian in the early 1950s. He has been criticized for espousing some Macedonist myths prominent in Macedonian historiography. Lunt publicly admitted that he received financial aid from the Yugoslav Council for Science and Culture and the Macedonian Ministry of Education, Science and Culture for his work in the area.

He died at the age of 91. He was survived by his wife, Sally Herman Lunt, daughters Catherine and Elizabeth, five grandchildren, and son-in-law David.

Selected works 
 Lunt, H.G. (2001) Old Church Slavonic Grammar, 7th ed. (Walter de Gruyter) ; first ed. 1955 (Mouton & Co.)
 Lunt, H.G. (1952) A Grammar of the Macedonian Literary Language (Skopje)

References 

Linguists
Slavists
Harvard University faculty
1918 births
2010 deaths
Macedonists
People from Colorado Springs, Colorado
Harvard College alumni
University of California alumni
Charles University alumni
Columbia University alumni
Linguists from the United States